Ralph Howard, 1st Viscount Wicklow PC (I) (29 August 1727 – 26 June 1789) was an Anglo-Irish politician and nobleman.

Early life
Ralph Howard was born on 29 August 1727 at Shelton Abbey, County Wicklow, the eldest son of seven children born to the former Patience Boleyn and the Rt. Rev. Robert Howard (1670–1740), Bishop of Elphin.

His paternal grandfather was Dr. Ralph Howard. His maternal grandparents were Godfrey Boleyn of Fennor, County Meath ( a distant connection of the family of Anne Boleyn), and Mary Singleton,  sister of Henry Singleton, Chief Justice of the Irish Common Pleas.

Career
Howard was High Sheriff of Wicklow in 1749, and of County Carlow in 1754. In 1761 and 1768 he was elected M.P. for both Wicklow County and the borough of St Johnstown, choosing to sit for the county.

In May 1770, he was appointed to the Privy Council of Ireland and on 12 July 1776 Howard was raised to the Peerage of Ireland as Baron Clonmore of Clonmore Castle, County Carlow. In June 1785 he was further honoured as Viscount Wicklow, but died a year later.

Personal life
On 11 August 1755, Howard was married to Alice Forward, the daughter and sole heiress of William Forward of Castle Forward in County Donegal, and the former Isabella Stewart. Together, they were the parents of eleven children, including:

 Robert Howard, 2nd Earl of Wicklow (1757–1815), a Representative Peer for Ireland from 1800 to 1815 who died unmarried.
 William Howard, 3rd Earl of Wicklow (1761–1818), who married Eleanor Caulfeild, the only daughter of Hon. Francis Caulfeild MP (second son of James Caulfeild, 3rd Viscount Charlemont) and the former Hon. Mary Eyre (only daughter and heiress of John Eyre, 1st Baron Eyre).
 Hon. Hugh Howard (1761–1840), an MP who married Catharine Bligh, second daughter of Very Rev. Robert Bligh, Dean of Elphin, in 1792.
 Hon. Henry Howard (d. 1793), who died in battle in Flanders.
 Lady Mary Howard (d. 1798), who married Rev. Thomas Hore, second son of Walter Hore of Harperstown, in 1797.

Lord Wicklow died on 26 June 1789 at his house in Rutland Square in Dublin. His widow was created Countess of Wicklow in her own right on 20 December 1793. She died on 7 March 1807. Their son, Robert Howard, succeeded her as Earl of Wicklow. Their great-grandnephew Ralph Howard became the seventh Earl of Wicklow.

Legacy
Howard's grave site has become a landmark due to the large pyramid style marker.

References

|-

1726 births
1786 deaths
Howard, Ralph
Howard, Ralph
Ralph
Howard, Ralph
Howard, Ralph
Members of the Privy Council of Ireland
Viscounts in the Peerage of Ireland
Peers of Ireland created by George III
Members of the Parliament of Ireland (pre-1801) for County Donegal constituencies
Members of the Parliament of Ireland (pre-1801) for County Wicklow constituencies